PivotX is an open-source blog software written in PHP using either flat files or a database to store content. It uses the Smarty web template system and the TinyMCE editor. One installation can handle several blogs, each with its own configuration, including themes. Users belong to different levels regarding managing and editing privileges. New functions can be added via extensions managed through the admin interface.

Its development began in 2001 under the name Pivot, using only flat files. In 2012, PivotX developers announced that future versions of this CMS will go two ways: full-fledged "Pivot 4", built on Symfony2 framework, and lightweight "Bolt" CMS, built on Silex framework. However, work continued on PivotX, with version 2.3.8 released in January, 2014. In 2017 it was announced that it's no longer actively developed.

PivotX is free software released under the GNU GPL 2.0 license.

References

External links 
Official PivotX github
Official PivotX site
Official Bolt site

Blog software
Free content management systems
Free software programmed in PHP